The Eurasian otter (Lutra lutra), also known as the European otter, Eurasian river otter, common otter, and Old World otter, is a semiaquatic mammal native to Eurasia. The most widely distributed member of the otter subfamily (Lutrinae) of the weasel family (Mustelidae), it is found in the waterways and coasts of Europe, many parts of Asia, and parts of northern Africa. The Eurasian otter has a diet mainly of fish, and is strongly territorial. It is endangered in some parts of its range, but is recovering in others.

Description

The Eurasian otter is a typical species of the otter subfamily. Brown above and cream below, these long, slender creatures are well-equipped for their aquatic habits. Their bones show osteosclerosis, increasing their density to reduce buoyancy. This otter differs from the North American river otter by its shorter neck, broader visage, the greater space between the ears and its longer tail. However, the Eurasian otter is the only otter in much of its range, so it is rarely confused for any other animal. The female is shorter than the male.

Distribution and habitat

The Eurasian otter is the most widely distributed otter species, its range including parts of Asia and northern Africa, as well as being spread across Europe, south to Palestine. Though currently thought to be extinct in Liechtenstein and Switzerland, it is now common in Latvia, along the coast of Norway, in the western regions of Spain and Portugal and across Great Britain and Ireland. In Italy, it lives in southern parts of the peninsula.
It inhabits unpolluted bodies of fresh water such as lakes, streams, rivers, canals and ponds, as long as the food supply is adequate. In Andalusia, it uses artificial lakes on golf courses. It prefers the open areas of the streams and also lives along the coast in salt water, but requires regular access to fresh water to clean its fur.

In Syria, the Eurasian otter was recorded in montane creeks in Latakia and Raqqa Governorates and in the lower Euphrates valley in Deir ez-Zor Governorate.
In India, it is distributed in the Himalayan foothills, southern Western Ghats and the central Indian landscape.

Behaviour and ecology

Diet

The Eurasian otter's diet mainly consists of fish. Fish is its most preferred choice of food in Mediterranean and temperate freshwater habitats. During the winter and in colder environments, it also feeds on amphibians, crustaceans, insects, birds and sometimes small mammals, including young European beavers.

As with various other mustelid species, otters are capable of overpowering and killing prey significantly larger than themselves, and are known to hunt large waterbirds such as adult greylag geese on occasion.

Breeding
Eurasian otters are strongly territorial, living alone for the most part. The length of the territory depends on the density of food available and the width of the water suitable for hunting (it is shorter on coasts, where the available width is much wider, and longer on narrower rivers). The Eurasian otter uses its feces, called spraints, to mark its territory and prioritize the use of resources to other group members. The territories are only held against members of the same sex, so those of males and females may overlap. Mating takes place in water. Eurasian otters are nonseasonal breeders (males and females will breed at any time of the year) and it has been found that their mating season is most likely determined simply by the otters' reproductive maturity and physiological state. Female otters become sexually mature between 18 and 24 months old and the average age of first breeding is found to be  years. Gestation for the Eurasian otter is 60–64 days, the litter weighing about 10% of the female body mass. After the gestation period, one to four pups are born, which remain dependent on the mother for about 13 months. The male plays no direct role in parental care, although the territory of a female with her pups is usually entirely within that of the male. Hunting mainly takes place at night, while the day is usually spent in the Eurasian otter's holt (den) – usually a burrow or hollow tree on the riverbank which can sometimes only be entered from underwater. Though long thought to hunt using sight and touch only, evidence is emerging that they may also be able to smell underwater – possibly in a similar manner to the star-nosed mole.

Taxonomy 
The extinct Japanese otter is sometimes considered a subspecies; recent studies have found it to fall outside the subspecific clades comprising L. lutra, so it has been reclassified as a distinct species, but significant uncertainty remains.

Conservation
The Eurasian otter declined across its range in the second half of the 20th century primarily due to pollution from pesticides such as organochlorine and polychlorinated biphenyls. Other threats included habitat loss and hunting, both legal and illegal. Eurasian otter populations are now recovering in many parts of Europe. In the United Kingdom, the number of sites with an otter presence increased by 55% between 1994 and 2002. In August, 2011, the Environment Agency announced that otters had returned to every county in England since vanishing from every county except the West Country and parts of Northern England. Recovery is partly due to a ban on the most harmful pesticides that has been in place across Europe since 1979, partly to improvements in water quality leading to increases in prey populations, and partly to direct legal protection under the European Union Habitats Directive and national legislation in several European countries. In Hong Kong, it is a protected species under Wild Animals Protection Ordinance Cap 170. It is listed as Near Threatened by the IUCN Red List.

It is listed as endangered in Pakistan, India, Bangladesh, Myanmar and Thailand, and critically endangered in Mongolia. In South Korea, it is listed as a Natural Monument and first-class endangered species.

Most species that are victims of population decline or a loss of habitat tend to eventually lose their genetic difference due to inbreeding from small populations. A study conducted in 2001, examined whether or not the populations of Eurasian otters suffered from a lack of genetic variability. In the study, they examined teeth of otter skulls at the Zoological Museum, Copenhagen and the Natural History Museum, Aarhus. The samples were collected between 1883 and 1963 in Denmark (Funen, Zealand, and Jutland). The study examined the tissue on the teeth of the skulls and determined the genetic variability based on DNA analysis. In conclusion, the study discovered that despite the population declines, the Eurasian otter was not a victim of declining genetic variability.

The decline in population of native freshwater fishes in the rivers of Iberia, which is the preferred food of Eurasian otters, along with the expansion of exotic fish species like centrarchids could potentially put Eurasian otters at risk for extinction.

References

Further reading
 Laidler, Liz. Otters in Britain. David & Charles, 1982.

External links

Eurasian otter
Carnivorans of Asia
Carnivorans of Europe
Endangered animals
Endangered biota of Asia
Endangered biota of Europe
Near threatened animals
Eurasian otter
Eurasian otter
Articles containing video clips
Semiaquatic mammals